Allahabad (also romanized as Allāhābād) is a tiny village in Chahar Gonbad Rural District, in the Central District of Sirjan County, Kerman Province, Iran. At the 2006 census, its population was 39, in 9 families.

References 

Populated places in Sirjan County